{{automatic taxobox
| image = Caulobacter crescentus.jpg
| image_alt = "Caulobacter crescentus"
| image_caption = Caulobacter crescentus
| taxon = Caulobacter
| authority = Poindexter 1964
| subdivision_ranks = Species
| subdivision =
C. crescentus
C. daechungensis
C. flavus
C. fusiformis
C. ginsengisoli
C. heinricii
C. hibisciC. mirabilisC. mirareC. profundisC. radicisC. rhizosphaeraeC. segnisC. zeae}}Caulobacter is a genus of Gram-negative bacteria in the class Alphaproteobacteria. Its best-known member is Caulobacter crescentus, an organism ubiquitous in freshwater lakes and rivers; many members of the genus are specialized to oligotrophic environments.

Interactions with other organisms
Pathogenicity
Although Caulobacter is not commonly appreciated as a cause of human diseases, Caulobacter isolates have been implicated in a number of cases of recurrent peritonitis in peritoneal dialysis patients. One study has identified the species C. crescentus and C. mirare as the cause of a disease of the moth Galleria mellonella; the absence of identified distinct virulence factors in C. mirare may suggest that other Caulobacter'' species have pathogenic potential.

References

External links
 https://microbewiki.kenyon.edu/index.php/Caulobacter
 https://www.ncbi.nlm.nih.gov/Taxonomy/Browser/wwwtax.cgi?mode=Undef&id=75&lvl=3&keep=1&srchmode=1&unlock

Caulobacterales